Asan Memorial Poetry Prize or Asan Smaraka Kavitha Puraskaram is a literary  award instituted in 1985 by Madras-based Asan Memorial Association in memory of Malayalam poet Kumaran Asan. It is given annually to honour outstanding poets in Malayalam language. The award comprises a purse of Rs 50000, sculpture and certificate. The award was also conferred to Tamil writers in the initial years.

Recipients
 1985: C. Mani
 1986: N. N. Kakkad
 1987: Sundara Ramaswamy
 1988: Yusufali Kechery
 1989:	Soundara Kailasam
 1990:	Sugathakumari
 1992:	P. Bhaskaran
 1993:	O. N. V. Kurup
 1994:	Akkitham Achuthan Namboothiri
 1995:	Kadammanitta Ramakrishnan
 1996:	Vishnunarayanan Namboothiri
 1997:	Attoor Ravi Varma
 1998:	Olappamanna
 1999:	Ayyappa Paniker
 2000:	K. Satchidanandan
 2001:	Pala Narayanan Nair
 2002:	M. P. Appan
 2003:	V. Madhusoodhanan Nair
 2004:	K. G. Sankara Pillai
 2005:	Kilimanoor Ramakanthan
 2006:	D. Vinayachandran
 2007:	Madhavan Ayyappath
 2008:	Puthussery Ramachandran
 2009:	M. N. Paloor
 2010:	A. Ayyappan
 2011:	S. Ramesan Nair
 2012: Sreekumaran Thampi
 2013: N. K. Desam
 2014: Prabha Varma
 2015: Chemmanam Chacko
 2016: Ezhachery Ramachandran
 2018: Desamangalam Ramakrishnan
 2019: S. Rameshan
 2020: Puthussery Ramachandran
 2021: K. Jayakumar

See also
 List of Malayalam literary awards

References

External links
 Asan Memorial Association

Indian literary awards
Malayalam literary awards
Awards established in 1985
1985 establishments in West Bengal